Randall Roth is a Canadian retired ice hockey center who was a two-time All-American for Harvard.

Career
Roth came to Harvard University in 1971 and played on the freshman team before joining the varsity hockey club as a sophomore. In each of his three year with the program, Roth was the team's leading scorer, but it was during his junior season that he became a Crimson legend. In that season's Beanpot tournament, Roth scored the overtime goal in the championship game, winning the program's first title in six years. He continued to play well throughout the season and helped the Crimson finish second in both the regular season and the ECAC tournament. He was named ECAC Player of the Year and to the All-American team. Roth helped Harvard score 10 goals in the NCAA Tournament but the team still managed to lose both of their games.

For his senior season, Roth was named team captain and led Harvard to the top of the ECAC standings. Harvard lost just once in 20 conference games and ran through the first two round of the ECAC tournament but the team was stymied again in the title game. Harvard made a second consecutive trip to the NCAA Tournament and Roth helped the team record 9 goals in 2 games, but the defense was rather porous, allowing 16 scored and Harvard again finished in 4th place.

After graduating, Roth played two seasons of senior hockey before ending his career. When he graduated, Roth was Harvard 4th all-time leading scorer and his exploits were remembered. He was inducted into the Harvard Athletic Hall of Fame in 1997 and the Beanpot Hall of Fame in 2000.

Career statistics

Regular season and playoffs

Awards and honors

References

External links

1952 births
Living people
Canadian ice hockey centres
Ice hockey people from Ontario
People from Woodstock, Ontario
Harvard Crimson men's ice hockey players
AHCA Division I men's ice hockey All-Americans